The Nibong Tebal railway station is a Malaysian railway station located at and named after the town of Nibong Tebal, Pulau Pinang. The old railway station in Nibong Tebal was demolished on 26 January 2010. It was reported that the station is close to 70–100 years. The old 10m iron railway bridge across the Krian River, had also vanished.

External links
 Nibong Tebal Railway Station

Railway stations closed in 2009
Railway stations in Penang
South Seberang Perai District